The Denmark Men's Volleyball League is a men's volleyball competition organized by the Dansk Volleyball Forbund (DVF), it was created in 1963.

History 
In the 2018/19 season in Elitsidizion 11 teams has participated: "Gentofte, Marienlist (Odense), Vidovre, Middelfart, Aarhus, Ishoi, Westchellann (Corser), Nordenskuv Ungdoms-Og (Orré-Sogne), Ikast KFUM (Ikast), Ishoi, Amager (Copenhagen), Aalborg. The championship title was won for the second time in a row by "Gentofte", who won the final series beating "Vidovre" 3-1 (3:0, 3:0, 1:3, 3:2). The 3rd place went to "Marienlist".

Winners list

References

External links
Danish Volleyball Federation 

Denmark
Sports leagues established in 1963
1963 establishments in Denmark
Volleyball in Denmark
Professional sports leagues in Denmark